The 2006 UEFA European Under-17 Championship was the fifth edition of UEFA's European Under-17 Football Championship. Luxembourg hosted the championship, during 3–14 May. Russia defeated the Czech Republic in the final to win the competition for the first time. Players born after 1 January 1989 could participate in this competition.

Squads

Is for 17 and younger normally Between late May to early June

Qualifying
There were two qualifying rounds.

Teams

 (host)

Match Officials 
A total of 6 referees, 8 assistant referees and 2 fourth officials were appointed for the final tournament.

Referees
 William Collum
 Thomas Einwaller
 Hannes Kaasik
 Björn Kuipers
 Alexey Kulbakov
 Aleksandar Stavrev

Assistant referees
 José Tiago Gracias Bolinhas Trigo
 Edward King
 Igor Krmar
 Vesselin Mishev Dobrianov
 Manuel Navarro
 Dag Roger Nebben
 Cem Satman
 Tomas Somolani

Fourth officials
 Albert Toussaint
 Luc Wilmes

Group stage

Group A

Group B

Knockout stage

Semifinals

Third Place Playoff

Final

Goalscorers

Golden Player

 Toni Kroos

References

UEFA.com
RSSSF.com

External links
Luxembourg 2006 magazine from UefaU17.com

 
2006
2005–06 in Luxembourgian football
UEFA
International association football competitions hosted by Luxembourg
May 2006 sports events in Europe
2006 in youth association football
Ettelbruck
Sports competitions in Luxembourg City
2000s in Luxembourg City